Paul Harold Macklin, PC, MP (born May 22, 1944 in Northumberland County, Ontario) is a Canadian politician.  He was a member of the House of Commons of Canada, representing the riding of Northumberland—Quinte West of the Liberal Party caucus from 2000 to 2006.

Macklin has a Bachelor of Arts degree from the University of Western Ontario, and a law degree from the University of Windsor.  After being called to the bar, Macklin worked for the Toronto firm of Davies, Ward & Beck.

He was first elected to Parliament in the federal election of 2000, winning a fairly easily victory over his Canadian Alliance and Progressive Conservative opponents in the riding of Northumberland.  The CA and PC parties merged in late 2003, and Macklin faced a much more difficult challenge in that year's federal election, defeating Conservative Doug Galt by only 313 votes.

Macklin served as Parliamentary Secretary to the Minister of Justice and Attorney General of Canada from February 2002 to December 2003, and was re-appointed to the position on July 20, 2004.

He was defeated by Conservative Rick Norlock in the 2006 election.  Macklin was acclaimed as the Liberal candidate for the riding of Northumberland-Quinte West for the 2008 election, and was again defeated by Norlock.

In July 2009, Paul Macklin announced he would not seek the Liberal nomination in Northumberland-Quinte West for the next election. The following September his successor was determined by a Liberal nomination race and Cobourg business woman Kim Rudd was chosen to succeed Macklin.

Paul Macklin currently sits on the Northumberland-Quinte West Federal Liberal Association as the Policy Director, still active in politics and a key advisor to Rudd and her campaign.

Electoral record

References

Liberal Party of Canada MPs
Members of the House of Commons of Canada from Ontario
1944 births
Living people
Lawyers in Ontario
University of Western Ontario alumni
University of Windsor Faculty of Law alumni
People from Northumberland County, Ontario
21st-century Canadian politicians